QY or qy may refer to:

 ABC Far North, a radio station (former call letters 4QY)
 European Air Transport (IATA designator QY)
 Quay, on maps
 Yamaha QY10, a hand-held music workstation

See also
 YQ (disambiguation)